Czech Lion Award for Best Short Film is an award given to the best Czech animated film. It was established in 2020.

Winners

References 

Czech Lion Awards
Awards established in 2020